Wilmary Álvarez (born 13 May 1984) is a Venezuelan track and field sprinter who competes in the 100 metres, 200 metres and 400 metres. She is a seven-time medallist at the South American Championships in Athletics, having won a medal in all of the individual sprint and relay events. She took a gold medal in the 4 × 100 metres relay at the 2014 South American Games.

With the Venezuelan women's relay team she has performed at 2011 Military World Games, the IAAF World Relays twice (2014, 2015) and also the 2015 Pan American Games. She helped set Venezuelan records in the 4 × 100 metres relay (44.81 seconds in 2012) and the 4 × 400 metres relay (3:34.30 minutes in 2003).

At regional level she has won several medals at the Bolivarian Games, Ibero-American Championships in Athletics and ALBA Games. She was also highly successful in age category competitions, taking medals at South American youth, junior and under-23 levels.

Personal bests
100 metres – 11.59 (2003)
200 metres – 23.39 (2003)
400 metres – 53.33 (2008)

International competitions

References

All-Athletics

Living people
1984 births
Venezuelan female sprinters
Pan American Games competitors for Venezuela
Athletes (track and field) at the 2015 Pan American Games
South American Games gold medalists for Venezuela
South American Games silver medalists for Venezuela
South American Games bronze medalists for Venezuela
South American Games medalists in athletics
Competitors at the 2002 South American Games
Competitors at the 2006 South American Games
Competitors at the 2014 South American Games
21st-century Venezuelan women